Theophanes is a crater on Mercury.  Its name was adopted by the IAU in 1976, after the Byzantine painter Theophanes.

Hollows are present within Theophanes and to the west of the crater.

References

Impact craters on Mercury